Nebraska Highway 51 is a highway in eastern Nebraska. It has a western terminus at U.S. Highway 275 northwest of Wisner and an eastern terminus at the Burt County Missouri River Bridge at the Missouri River in Decatur.

Route description
Nebraska Highway 51 begins northwest of Wisner at U.S. 275.  It goes east into farmland and meets Nebraska Highway 9 west of Bancroft.  It continues east and skirts the southern edge of Bancroft, after which it meets Nebraska Highway 16.  After five miles (8 km), it meets U.S. Highway 77.  It continues east and meets U.S. Highway 75 in Decatur.  (According to a 1940 map, the highway turned south at Highway 77 to Lyons and then went east from Lyons to Decatur.  It was apparently rerouted sometime between 1940 and 1955.  The old section of road is now listed as Old Highway 118.)  After overlapping in Decatur, Highway 51 turns east and crosses the Missouri River via the Burt County Missouri River Bridge.  The highway continues on in Iowa as Iowa Highway 175.

Major intersections

References

External links

 Nebraska Roads: NE 41-60
   Nebraska Dept. of Roads Map Library

051
Transportation in Cuming County, Nebraska
Transportation in Burt County, Nebraska